USS Pondera (APA-191) was a Haskell-class attack transport acquired by the U.S. Navy during World War II for the task of transporting troops to and from combat areas.

World War II service 

Pondera (APA–191), built under Maritime Commission contact (MCV hull 659), was laid down by the Kaiser Shipbuilding Co., Vancouver, Washington, 28 April 1944; launched 27 July 1944; sponsored by Miss Elinor C. Gottlieb; delivered to the Navy and commissioned 24 September 1944.

Landing Seabee’s and troops and their equipment on Okinawa 
 
Following shakedown, Pondera remained in California waters, training pre-commissioning crews for APAs, until 23 January 1945. Two weeks of amphibious training followed and in February she departed San Francisco, California, for Hawaii. After further amphibious training she carried the 81st Construction Battalion to Okinawa, anchoring off Hagushi 26 April. Later shifting to Nakagusuku Wan, she disembarked troops there 3–4 May and during the night assisted , damaged by a suicide boat. On the 8th she departed, with casualties embarked, for Saipan, whence she sailed to San Francisco, California.

End-of-war "mopping-up" operations 
 
She completed a second troop lift to the Far East, Leyte, in July, and was en route on her third transpacific run when the war ended. Arriving at Ulithi 25 August, she sailed to Guam, disembarked half of her troops there, then continued on to Okinawa to discharge the remainder. In mid-September she took on men of the XXIV Corps and on the 24th debarked them at Jinsen, Korea. In October she carried further elements of that Corps to Korea, then, after replenishing at Manila, joined TransRon 17, 8 November, at Hong Kong, to lift troops of the 8th Chinese Nationalist Army to Tsingtao. Completing that mission 16 November, Pondera reported for Operation Magic Carpet duty and on 20 November arrived at San Diego, California, with units of the 5th Marine Division. She completed her second and last "Magic Carpet" run at San Francisco 9 March 1946 and ten days later got underway for the U.S. East Coast and inactivation.

Post-war decommissioning 

Arriving at Norfolk, Virginia, 6 April, she decommissioned and was transferred to the Maritime Commission 6 June 1946. Struck from the Navy List 19 June 1946, she was laid up in the James River, Virginia, berthing area, National Defense Reserve Fleet, where she remained into 1974 when she was sold for scrapping.

Military awards and honors 

Pondera earned one battle star during World War II.

References

External links 
 USS Pondera
 NavSource Online: Amphibious Photo Archive - APA-191 Pondera

Haskell-class attack transports
Pondera County, Montana
World War II amphibious warfare vessels of the United States
Troop ships
Ships built in Vancouver, Washington
1944 ships